Mehdi Haghizadeh (born September 16, 1981, in Tehran) is an Iranian former professional soccer footballer and a coach. As a wing-midfielder, he played in Iran, 
United Arab Emirates and Sweden. A clever technical midfielder, Haghizadeh played for Iranian National team in the tournament of West Asian Football Championship in 1996. During his career he scored spectacular goals one of which was in the final match of Sweden's DM Cup in 2010.

Following his retirement, he pursued coaching career commencing by attending coaching courses and obtained many certificates.

Club career

Football clubs summary

Mehdi Haghizadeh was only 13 years old when he began playing football with Alborz F.C. in Iran in 1994.  Following his father who is a former soccer player and watching soccer matches, he found his passion in playing soccer. Two years later, based on his talent and intelligence, Saipa F.C signed a contract with him where he played for two years until 1998. In 1996 he was called by Iranian head coach to play for Iran National team in West Asian tournament. He played in two games for National Football Team and his amazing performance helped him join Pas F.C. He made 19 appearances in Pas and scored 11 goals in one season. Then he signed a contract with Esteghlal Tehran in 1998. Esteghlal F.C is one of the most popular clubs in Asia and achieved many national and international trophies and championships. He played fives years in Esteghlal F.C and scored 24 goals. 
Mehdi was doing very well in Esteghlal F.C when a car crash paused his amazing performance for two years. He was driving to attend a funeral of his relative that his car had a terrifying accident. Fortunately, all passengers and himself survived but he was involved in some therapies, and he chose to take care of his beloved ones affected by that accident. He refused invitations and stopped playing professionally for two years but his perseverance and determination helped him practice regularly and keep himself in good shape.

International career

When he decided to come back to the field, he received an invitation from Etisalat F.C in United Arab Emirates. He joined Etisalat F.C in 2006 and in 24 matches he scored 13 goals.
Mehdi had such a magnificent performance in Etisalat that persuaded Melleruds IF team in Sweden to advance and hire him. His European experience started in 2007. He played three seasons in Melleruds IF club and scored unforgettable goals. One of the most remarkable goals was in the final match of Sweden's DM Cup in 2010. Because of Haghizadeh's amazing goal, Melleruds IF won the title of League Champions in DM Cup's Final match in 2010.

Return to Asia
When his contract with Melleruds IF was over, he decided to come back to Iran and to apply for immigration to Canada.

Coaching

When he was playing in Melleruds IF in Sweden, he Developed and organized an educational plan to maintain high academic standards for players of 6 to 12 years old in that club. 
 
Once he landed in Canada as an immigrant, he attended many courses to become a knowledgeable, creative and determined coach. He achieved his first certificate in 2016 and in 2018 he became the coach of U15 AA Boys in Montreal and stepped the first place in ARSC tournament.

He continued attending programs to achieve his C license certificate in 2019 and his B license certificate in 2021. Meanwhile, he has been coaching several teams including but not limited to, U15 and U 16 boys of Montreal and achieved many championships. He was honored the best coach of the year in 2019.

References

Iranian footballers
Living people
1981 births
Esteghlal F.C. players
Association football midfielders